Mustafa IV (8 September 1779 – 16 November 1808) was the Sultan of the Ottoman Empire from 1807 to 1808.

Early life
Mustafa IV was born on 8 September 1779 in Constantinople. He was the son of Sultan Abdul Hamid I (1774–1789) and Sineperver Sultan.

Both he and his brother, Mahmud II, were the last remaining male members of the House of Osman after their cousin, the reformist Sultan Selim III (1789–1807). They alone were therefore eligible to inherit the throne from Selim, by whom they were treated favorably. Since Mustafa was the elder, he took precedence over his brother to the throne. During his short reign, Mustafa would both save his cousin's life, and order him murdered. Mustafa was Sultan Selim III's favourite crown prince, but he deceived his cousin and co-operated with the rebels to take his throne.

Reign
Mustafa ascended to the throne after the deposition of his cousin, Selim, on 29 May 1807. He came to the throne in the wake of the turbulent events that led to the fatwa against Selim for "introduce[ing] among the Muslims the manners of infidels and showing an intention to suppress the Janissaries." Selim fled to the palace, where he swore fealty to his cousin as the new sultan, and attempted to commit suicide. Mustafa spared his life by smashing the cup of poison that his cousin attempted to drink.

Mustafa's brief reign was turbulent. Immediately upon ascending to the throne, the Janissaries rioted throughout Constantinople, looting and murdering anyone who appeared to support Selim. More threatening, however, was a truce signed with the Russians, which freed Mustafa Pasha, a pro-reformist commander stationed on the Danube to march his army back to Constantinople in an effort to restore Selim. With the aid of the Grand Vizier of Adrianople, the army marched on the capital and seized the palace.
 

Sarıbeyzade Aleko, the interpreter of Fenerli Divan-ı Hümayun, was executed on 11 September 1807 because he was involved in spying on government affairs that were not related to his job.  It was written that he gave the betrayal and state secrets to the enemy in the label hanging around his neck. This execution tightened Ottoman-French relations.  French envoy Sebastiani protested the execution of Aleko, who was under the patronage of the government by going to Babıali. After the cease-fire agreement signed in the Russian lada and the turmoil in the Silistra army, the Ottoman troops returned to Edirne, who had no army character left.

Meanwhile in Istanbul and Edirne, after a long winter, centre frosts were experienced, shortages and wood shortages were experienced. The situation of the troops and the cadre of Edirne was devastated. Soldiers were asked to dispatch soldiers from the provincial governors, until only an exquisite number of soldiers had come from a few places near Istanbul such as Izmit and Şile. The pro-Nizam-ı Cedid protestors in Anatolia and Çapanoğlu Süleyman Bey, in the first place, had cut all kinds of aid towards Istanbul.

Attempting to secure his position by positing himself as the only surviving heir of Osman, Mustafa ordered both Selim and his brother Mahmud murdered at Topkapı Palace, Constantinople. He then ordered his guards to show the rebels Selim's body, and they promptly tossed it into the inner courtyard of the palace. Mustafa then ascended his throne, assuming that Mahmud was also dead, but the prince had been hiding in the furnace of a bath. Just as the rebels demanded that Mustafa "yield his place to a worthier," Mahmud revealed himself, and Mustafa was deposed. The failure of his short reign prevented the efforts to undo the reforms, which continued under Mahmud.

Death
Mustafa was later killed on Mahmud's orders on 16 November 1808, and was buried in his father's mausoleum.

Family 
Due to his short reign, Mustafa IV did not have a large family. He had four known consorts, a son and a daughter, both of whom died newborn.

Consorts 
Mustafa IV had four known consorts:   
 Şevkinür Kadın. BaşKadin (first consort). She died in 1812 and was buried in Abdülhamid I's mausoleum.
 Peykidil Kadın. She was executed in 1808 by Mahmud II, accused of having plotted against him together with Mustafa IV.
 Dilpezir Kadın. She died in 1809 and was buried in Abdülhamid I's mausoleum.
 Seyare Kadın. She died in 1817 and was buried in Abdülhamid I's mausoleum.

Sons 
Mustafa IV had only one son: 
 Şehzade Ahmed (1808/1809 - 1809).

Daughters 
Mustafa IV had only one daughter:  
 Emine Sultan (6 May 1809 - October 1809). She is buried with her father in the Hamidiye mausoleum.

References

Sources

External links 
 
 http://www.uslanmam.com/turk-kulturu/651298-sultan-i-abdulhamid-turbesi-eminonu.html 

1779 births
1808 deaths
Royalty from Istanbul
19th-century Ottoman sultans
Turks from the Ottoman Empire
Leaders who took power by coup
Leaders ousted by a coup